Herbivore men or grass-eater men (草食(系)男子, Sōshoku(-kei) danshi) is a term used in Japan to describe young men who express little interest in getting married or being assertive in relationships with women. The term was coined by the author Maki Fukasawa, who initially intended for it to describe a new form of masculinity that was not reliant on the proactivity and assertiveness typically associated with masculinity in Japan. Philosopher Masahiro Morioka defines herbivore men as "kind and gentle men who, without being bound by manliness, do not pursue romantic relationships voraciously and have no aptitude for being hurt or hurting others." A similar term denoting more proactive and assertive women is Carnivorous women  (肉食系の女性, Nikushoku-kei no josei)

According to Fukasawa, herbivore men are "not without romantic relationships, but have a non-assertive, indifferent attitude toward desires of flesh."

The term was quickly sensationalized by the media, gaining a negative connotation suggesting young men who had lost their "manliness" were responsible for Japan's declining birth rate and stagnating economy. Through mass media, the label of herbivore man came to be associated with irresponsible, overly feminine men who cared too much about their appearances rather than marriage or finding a stable job, which were seen as traditionally masculine goals. The definition of herbivore men is still debated because of this, making it difficult to estimate how many men in Japan identify as herbivore men, particularly considering the social stigma associated with the term.

Etymology 
Although the term "herbivore man" does not have a universally accepted definition, there are a few defining characteristics for herbivore men that seem widely agreed upon. This is largely because the traits associated with herbivore men are defined by popular culture and media rather than through academic fields, as demonstrated in the contrast between the perspective on masculinity that Maki Fukusawa intended to convey in coining the term compared to its current connotation.

Since the boundaries for what defines herbivore men are unclear, popularly cited surveys such as the one conducted by LifeNet concluded that in a sample group of 1000 unmarried men and women in their 20s and 30s, 378 men reported that they considered themselves "herbivorous." However, the survey asked participants to choose between whether they considered themselves carnivorous or herbivorous, with 45.9% of respondents clarifying that while they would not explicitly define themselves as herbivorous, they preferred it in comparison to carnivorous. Additionally, LifeNet's definition for "herbivorous" was based on two defining aspects: a general passivity about love and a preference to keep to themselves even if they have something to say.

Social stigma 
Indifference to marriage and committed relationships has been an observable trend in many socially and economically advanced societies. Japan's unique labor market structured around supporting salarymen as well as its recent economic decline have been cited as reasons for the rise in herbivore men. Economic decline showed the fragility of salarymen and permanent employment became less appealing, with many youth rejecting this employment path after schooling and choosing to work as part-timers. As of 2007, approximately 920,000 men are freeters, young people working exclusively part-time jobs. The youth unemployment rate peaked in 2010 at 9.47%. Many of these young men also find it difficult to marry because work and marriage in Japan are so interrelated. Many women refuse to marry men who do not have steady jobs since stable employment is seen as a sign of maturity, operating under the idea that men should be the breadwinners of the family. The view of freeters as ambitionless, irresponsible and un-masculine match many of the characteristics associated with herbivore men, with both groups often acting as scapegoats for Japan's economic decline. 

Japanese women might be further discouraging men from entering into romantic relationships. The decision that many herbivore men make to stop working, because work and marriage in Japan are so inter-related, may have made it more difficult for these Japanese men to find marriage. Many women refuse men who do not have steady jobs (such as freeters and NEETs). Other women feel that self-proclaimed herbivore men are weak and not masculine, while some men apparently are not attracted to "independent" women. In a 2011 poll of Japanese boys aged between 16 and 19, 36% described themselves as indifferent or averse towards having sex; the figure for girls in the same age group was at 59%. Masahiro Morioka argues that Japanese herbivore men are a result of Japan's post-war peace. Since the end of World War II, Japan has not directly participated in any war or conflict, either within its own borders or outside of them. Prior to this time of peace, many Japanese felt that becoming a soldier was the only approach to becoming manly. This social norm has slowly disappeared during the following period of post-war peace. Due to this, Japanese men are less aggressive and this could bleed over into their romantic lives.

Potential effects 
Japan recorded a sub-replacement fertility  rate of only 1.42 total fertility in 2014, down from a high of 1.84 in the mid 1980s. Many blame this drastic fall on the rise of herbivore men in Japan. The decline in birth rate has been attributed to the herbivore men's reluctance to marry.

Japan's population has been under a decline since 2011. In 2014, Japan's population was estimated at 127 million; this figure is expected to shrink to 107 million (16%) by 2040 and to 97 million (24%) by 2050 should the current demographic trend continue.

In media 
With the perceived rise of herbivore men in Japanese society, herbivore men have also become more prominent in Japanese culture and media. From 2008 to 2009, the term herbivore men became a widely used and trendy term in Japan. It even was voted into the top ten of Buzzwords of the Year in December 2009 by U-CAN. Sōshoku-kei danshi (Herbivore Men) was a movie released in 2010 in which one of the main characters displays herbivore tendencies. Throughout the movie, he struggles to understand sexual situations, such as a woman inviting him to sleep with her. In the same year, singer-songwriter Gackt held a male-only rock concert in an attempt to bolster "men's spirit ... and sexuality" against the herbivore men masculinity in Japan's society. 

The Single Lady (お一人様, Ohitorisama) was a TV drama broadcast in 2009, focusing on the relationship between an herbivore man and his coworker who end up sharing an apartment. Shinichi, the herbivore man, is portrayed as the exact opposite of a traditional "masculine" man, lacking ambition at work, relationship experience and intention of pursuing a relationship that is associated with masculinity. The drama was relatively popular and had an audience rating of 9.45%.

See also 

 Asexuality and aromanticism
 Bachelor
 Buddha-like mindset
 Freeter
 Hikikomori
 Incel
 Men Going Their Own Way
 NEET
 Parasite single
 Satori generation
 Soy boy

References

Further reading 
 
 

Interpersonal relationships
Intimate relationships
Japanese culture
Popular psychology
Psychological attitude
Sexual attraction
Sexuality in Japan
Terms for men
Wasei-eigo

ja:草食系#草食系男子（草食男子）